State Route 114 (SR 114) is a north–south state highway that traverses six counties in the western grand division of Tennessee. The  route travels from Clifton Junction to an area south of Paris via Scotts Hill, Lexington, and the Natchez Trace State Park.

Most of SR 114 is a secondary route, but a portion of the route between Clifton and Bath Springs is a primary route.

Route description

Wayne and Hardin Counties

SR 114 begins at Clifton Junction in western Wayne County, at an intersection with US 64 (SR 15). It goes north as an improved 2-lane highway and runs concurrently with US 641 as a secret, or hidden, designation. They pass through Clifton, where they have a short concurrency with SR 128, where it enters Hardin County, just before crossing a bridge over the Tennessee River before crossing into Decatur County.

Decatur County

SR 114 then follows a northwesterly path as it becomes signed at an intersection with SR 69 near Bath Springs, where it splits from US 641 and becomes concurrent with SR 69. They pass through Bath Springs before they split, with SR 114 continuing northwest. SR 114 has an intersection with SR 202 and passes through Lick Skillet before entering Scotts Hill and crossing into Henderson County.

Henderson County

SR 114 becomes concurrent with SR 201 in downtown before having an intersection with SR 100. They then leave Scott's Hill, where SR 201 splits off from SR 114 just to the north of town. The highway then enters Chesterfield, where it turns west to run concurrently with US 412 (SR 20) to Lexington as a 4-lane highway. They enter downtown Lexington and come to an intersection with SR 104, where SR 114 departs from US 412 (SR 20) as a 2-lane and continues northward to Natchez Trace State Park, where it crosses I-40 (Exit 116) and enters Carroll County.

Carroll and Henry Counties

SR 114 continues through mainly rural areas, passing through the communities of Yuma, where it has an intersection with SR 424, Westport, and Burna Vista before entering the town of Hollow Rock, where it has a short concurrency with US 70 (SR 1). It crosses the Big Sandy River between Westport and Buena Vista. SR 114 then crosses into Henry County and passes through Mansfield before reaching its northern terminus at the SR 77 junction just south of Paris.

History 
Until US 641 was extended into Decatur, northeast Hardin and northwest Wayne counties in 2015, SR 114 was signed in its course from US 64 to SR 69. US 641’s original southern terminus was at the I-40 junction at the Decatur–Benton county line.

Major intersections

See also 

 List of highways numbered 114

References
Official Tennessee Highway Maps

External links

 Tennessee Department of Transportation

114
Transportation in Carroll County, Tennessee
Transportation in Decatur County, Tennessee
Transportation in Hardin County, Tennessee
Transportation in Henderson County, Tennessee
Transportation in Henry County, Tennessee
Transportation in Wayne County, Tennessee